Gertrude Bernard  (June 18, 1906 – June 17, 1986), also known as Anahareo, was a writer, animal rights activist and conservationist of Algonquin and Mohawk ancestry.

Biography 
Gertrude Bernard was born in Mattawa, Ontario, on June 18, 1906. Her mother, Mary Nash Ockiping, was Algonquin. Her father, Matthew Bernard, was Algonquin and Mohawk. She grew up a strongly independent girl and young woman, and was described as something of a tomboy. Her friends nicknamed her "Pony".

When Bernard was 19, she met writer and imposter, Grey Owl, born Archibald Stansfeld Belaney, at Camp Wabikon in Temagami, Canada, where she was working as a waitress and he was a guide. Almost twice her age at 37, the English fur trapper claimed to be a half-Apache from the United States. As they got to know one another, she insisted on accompanying him to his traplines. She did not approve of the way he was living, and encouraged him to stop his trapping activities and become an animal rights activist. In Pilgrims of the Wild (1934), Belaney recounts how his young wife, by saving the lives of two beaver kits and raising them, led him to change his way of life and to work for the protection of wildlife. They considered themselves married, albeit informally, despite the fact he was still legally married to his first wife Angele Egwuna, an Ojibwe. They had two daughters.

The couple split up in 1936. Belaney died in 1938, a best-selling author. Shortly after his death, it was publicly revealed that he was not part-Apache as he had claimed, but an Englishman named Archibald Stansfeld Belaney. In 1940 Bernard, using the name Anahareo that Belaney had given her, wrote a book called My Life With Grey Owl with the encouragement of Belaney's publisher, Lovat Dickson. She was dissatisfied with it, in part because her lack of control over the final publication; it stereotyped her, as she put it, as "a sweet gentle Indian maiden." In 1972, she wrote the best-seller, Devil in Deerskins: My Life With Grey Owl, in which she denied having known Belaney's true origins. She said she had been hurt to discover his deception.

In 1939, she married a Swedish nobleman, Count Eric Axel Moltke-Huitfeldt. They had one daughter, Katharine. Her husband died in 1963. Over the 50 years following her separation from Belaney, Anahareo, as she is now better known, continued to be active in the conservation and animal rights movement. In 1979 she was admitted into the Order of Nature of the Paris-based International League of Animal Rights. She was elected a Member of the Order of Canada in 1983. On June 17, 1986, just a day before her 80th birthday, Anahareo died in Kamloops, British Columbia, Canada.

References

Further reading
 Kristin Gleeson: Anahareo: A Wilderness Spirit. Fireship Press, Tucson 2012 
 Kristin Gleeson: Blazing Her Own Trail: Anahareo's Rejection of Euro-Canadian Stereotypes, in Recollecting: Lives of Aboriginal Women of the Canadian Northwest and Borderlands, edited by Sarah Carter, Patricia McCormack, Athabasca University Press, 2010. The publication has won the Canadian Historical Association's Aboriginal history book prize, 2011

External links
 "Anahareo", The Canadian Encyclopedia

1906 births
1986 deaths
20th-century Canadian non-fiction writers
20th-century Canadian women writers
20th-century First Nations writers
Canadian animal rights activists
Canadian autobiographers
Canadian environmentalists
Canadian Mohawk people
Canadian women non-fiction writers
First Nations women writers
Members of the Order of Canada
People from Mattawa, Ontario
Women autobiographers